Max Tau was a German-Norwegian writer, editor, and publisher.

Life

Tau grew up in an environment characterized by what he later termed the "Jewish-German" symbiosis, in a Jewish household heavily influenced by the Jewish enlightenment. He studied literature, art history, philosophy, and psychology at universities in Berlin, Hamburg, and Kiel. He earned his doctorate at the University of Kiel, defending a dissertation on the German writer Theodor Fontane. With the assistance of Mildred Fish Harnack, an American active in the Red Orchestra anti-Nazi resistance group, Tau emigrated to Norway in 1935. During the Nazi-German occupation of Norway, he was a refugee in Sweden and returned to Norway after the war. He was noted for his contribution to promoting literary exchange between Germany and Norway, especially in the context of reconciliation after World War II. He obtained Norwegian citizenship while in exile in Sweden in 1944.

Awards 
1950 Peace Prize of the German Book Trade
1965 Nelly Sachs Prize
1970 Sonning Prize

References

External links

1897 births
1976 deaths
People from Bytom
University of Kiel alumni
Jewish emigrants from Nazi Germany to Norway
Naturalised citizens of Norway
Refugees in Sweden
Knights Commander of the Order of Merit of the Federal Republic of Germany
People from the Province of Silesia
German male writers